Kate Drohan (born December 24, 1973) is an American softball coach and former collegiate softball player who is the current head coach of the Northwestern Wildcats softball team in the Big Ten Conference. She led Northwestern to the 2006 Women's College World Series and a national runner up finish in 2022. She has mentored athletes Tammy Williams and Eileen Canney. She played college softball for the Providence Friars from 1992 to 1995 in the Big East Conference, where she was a three-time All-Conference honoree.

Early life and education
Drohan graduated from Providence College in 1995 with a degree biology. She played softball at Providence, where she was on the All-Big East team in 1992, 1994, and 1995.

Coaching career

Northwestern
Kate Drohan was promoted to head coach of the Northwestern softball program after the 2001 season, when long time head softball coach Sharon Drysdale retired.

Statistics

Providence Friars

Head coaching record

College

References

External links

 

Living people
Female sports coaches
American softball coaches
Softball players from Connecticut
Providence Friars softball players
Northwestern Wildcats softball coaches
Boston College Eagles softball coaches
1973 births